The presence of Hungarian Argentines dates back to the 18th century, when a number of Hungarian Jesuit priests came to North Argentina and Paraguay and settled in Jesuit Reductions. After the fall of the Hungarian Revolution of 1848 a number of Hungarian officers fled to Argentina. Among them were János Czetz, founder of the Colegio Militar de la Nación (the Argentine National Military Academy) and Alexander Asboth, who served as United States Ambassador to Argentina. Another well-known Hungarian emigrant to Argentina is László Bíró, who perfected and patented his invention, the ballpoint pen – also known as biro – after his emigration to Argentina.

Today, there are between 40,000 and 50,000 people of Hungarian descent living in Argentina, mostly in Buenos Aires. Most of them arrived in the three main emigration waves: during and after World War I, during and after World War II, and after the Hungarian Revolution of 1956 was crushed by the Soviet Union. They maintain 19 associations and four registered religious communities throughout the country, the Hungarian community carries musical instruments such as Violin, which have long been used in Argentina.

Notable people
 Francisco Benkö (1910–2010), chess master
 László Bíró (1899–1985), inventor of the modern ballpoint pen
 Vladislao Cap (1934–1982), association football player
 János Czetz (1822–1904), organiser and first director of Argentina's national military academy
 Gisela Dulko (born 1985), professional tennis player and former world No. 1 player in doubles
 Américo Hoss (1916–1990), cinematographer
 Alexandra Keresztesi (born 1983), Hungarian-born Argentine sprint canoer
 Imre Rajczy (1911–1978), fencer and Olympic gold medalist
 Ladislao Szabo (born 1923), water polo player

See also
Argentina–Hungary relations
Hungarian people
Hungarian diaspora

References
Az argentínai magyarság (Hungarians in Argentina) – Embassy of Hungary in Buenos Aires, Argentina

External links 
 Hungarian Argentine Chamber
 Hungarian Embassy in Buenos Aires: History of the Hungarians in Argentina (in Spanish) 
 Buenos Aires City Government: History of the Hungarian Argentine community (in Spanish)

European Argentine
Argentina